Phat Kongrum (born 7 September 1959) is a Thai Muay Thai fighter and amateur boxer. He was a Rajadamnern Stadium champion and competed in the men's lightweight division at the 1988 Summer Olympics.

Biography and career
Before amateur boxing, Kongrum had been competing in Muay Thai under the name "Samingnoom Sithiboontham" (สมิงหนุ่ม สิทธิบุญธรรม) and was considered one of the top Muay Thai fighters. He has fought with many famous Muay Thai boxers in the 1980s, such as Samart Payakaroon, Kongtoranee Payakaroon or Nokweed Devy. He fought Samart Payakaroon twice, in the year 1981 and in 1983 and lost both times.

Titles and accomplishments
Rajadamnern Stadium
 1981 Rajadamnern Stadium 115 lbs Champion
 1983 Rajadamnern Stadium 130 lbs Champion

Muay Thai record

|-  style="background:#cfc;"
| ? || Win ||align=left| Paul Lamout ||  || Helsinki, Finland ||  Decision || 5 || 3:00

|-  style="background:#cfc;"
| 1986- || Win ||align=left| Nelson Placentia||  || Los Angeles, United States ||  Decision || 5 || 3:00

|-  style="background:#fbb;"
| 1985-12-06|| Loss ||align=left| Lom Isan Sor.Thanikul ||  || Ubon Ratchathani, Thailand || Decision||5  ||3:00

|-  style="background:#cfc;"
| 1985-09-06 || Win ||align=left| Kulabkhao Na Nontachai || Rajadamnern Stadium || Bangkok, Thailand ||  Decision || 5 || 3:00

|-  style="background:#cfc;"
| 1985-03-02|| Win ||align=left| Lom Isan Sor.Thanikul ||  || Buriram province, Thailand || Decision || 5 ||3:00

|-  style="background:#fbb;"
| 1984-08-23|| Loss ||align=left| Nokweed Devy || Rajadamnern Stadium || Bangkok, Thailand || Decision || 5 || 3:00

|-  style="background:#;"
| 1983-04-28 || ||align=left| Khaosod Sitpraprom  || Rajadamnern Stadium || Bangkok, Thailand || ||  ||

|-  style="background:#cfc;"
| 1983-03-17 || Win ||align=left| Khaosod Sitpraprom  || Rajadamnern Stadium || Bangkok, Thailand ||  KO (Elbow)|| 3 || 
|-
! style=background:white colspan=9 |

|-  style="background:#fbb;"
| 1983-02-04 || Loss ||align=left| Samart Payakaroon || Lumpinee Stadium || Bangkok, Thailand || Decision || 5 || 3:00

|-  style="background:#cfc;"
| 1982-12-24 || Win ||align=left| Ruengsak Petchyindee || Rajadamnern Stadium || Bangkok, Thailand ||  Decision || 5 || 3:00

|-  style="background:#cfc;"
| 1982-11-27 || Win ||align=left| Singpathom Pongsurakan || Suranaree Boxing Stadium || Nakhon Ratchasima, Thailand ||  Decision || 5 || 3:00

|-  style="background:#cfc;"
| 1982-10-25 || Win ||align=left| Kengkaj Kiatkriangkrai || Rajadamnern Stadium || Bangkok, Thailand ||  Decision || 5 || 3:00

|-  style="background:#fbb;"
| 1982-08-25 || Loss ||align=left| Khaosod Sitpraprom || Rajadamnern Stadium || Bangkok, Thailand ||  Decision || 5 || 3:00

|-  style="background:#cfc;"
| 1982- || Win ||align=left| Kengkla Sitsei || Rajadamnern Stadium || Bangkok, Thailand ||  Decision || 5 || 3:00

|-  style="background:#cfc;"
| 1982-05-28 || Win ||align=left| Pon Sit Pordaeng || Lumpinee Stadium || Bangkok, Thailand ||  Decision || 5 || 3:00

|-  style="background:#cfc;"
| 1982-04-19 || Win ||align=left| Jomwo Sakniran || Rajadamnern Stadium || Bangkok, Thailand ||  Decision || 5 || 3:00

|-  style="background:#cfc;"
| 1982-03-29 || Win ||align=left| Jomwo Sakniran || Rajadamnern Stadium || Bangkok, Thailand ||  Decision || 5 || 3:00

|-  style="background:#cfc;"
| 1982- || Win ||align=left| Jock Kiatniwat ||  || Bangkok, Thailand ||  Decision || 5 || 3:00

|-  style="background:#fbb;"
| 1982-01-15|| Loss||align=left| Mafuang Weerapol || Lumpinee Stadium || Bangkok, Thailand || KO || 3||

|-  style="background:#cfc;"
| 1981-11-26|| Win ||align=left| Samransak Muangsurin|| Rajadamnern Stadium || Bangkok, Thailand || Decision || 5 ||3:00

|-  style="background:#fbb;"
| 1981-10-13|| Loss ||align=left| Samart Payakaroon || Lumpinee Stadium || Bangkok, Thailand || Decision || 5 || 3:00 
|-
! style=background:white colspan=9 |

|-  style="background:#cfc;"
| 1981-09-24|| Win||align=left| Ronnachai SunaKilaNongkhee || Rajadamnern Stadium|| Bangkok, Thailand || Decision || 5 || 3:00

|-  style="background:#cfc;"
| 1981-08-20|| Win||align=left| Jomwo Sakniran || Rajadamnern Stadium|| Bangkok, Thailand || Decision || 5 || 3:00

|-  style="background:#cfc;"
| 1981-07-23|| Win||align=left| Pon Sit Pordaeng || Rajadamnern Stadium|| Bangkok, Thailand || Decision || 5 || 3:00

|-  style="background:#;"
| 1981-06-18 || ||align=left| Jock Kiatniwat || Rajadamnern Stadium  || Bangkok, Thailand || ||  ||

|-  style="background:#fbb;"
| 1981-05-13|| Loss||align=left| Kongtoranee Payakaroon || Rajadamnern Stadium || Bangkok, Thailand || Decision || 5 || 3:00

|-  style="background:#cfc;"
| 1981-|| Win||align=left| Pol Sitpordaeng ||  || Bangkok, Thailand || Decision || 5 || 3:00

|-  style="background:#cfc;"
| 1981-|| Win ||align=left| Tong Petchyindee || Rajadamnern Stadium || Bangkok, Thailand || Decision (Unanimous) || 5 || 3:00 
|-
! style=background:white colspan=9 |

|-  style="background:#cfc;"
| 1980-11-06|| Win||align=left| Samingnoom Ludrayong|| Rajadamnern Stadium|| Bangkok, Thailand || Decision || 5 || 3:00

|-  style="background:#cfc;"
| 1980-05-17|| Win||align=left| Rungroj Lookcholae|| Rajadamnern Stadium|| Ubon Ratchathani, Thailand || Decision || 5 || 3:00

|-  style="background:#fbb;"
| 1979-09-21|| Loss ||align=left| Kiatnon Lukbanphra|| Lumpinee Stadium|| Bangkok, Thailand || Referee stoppage|| 5 ||

|-  style="background:#cfc;"
| 1979-08-21|| Win||align=left| Phadam Lukbangbo|| Lumpinee Stadium|| Bangkok, Thailand || Decision || 5 || 3:00

|-  style="background:#;"
| 1979- || ||align=left| Orachunnoi Hor.Mahachai ||  ||  Thailand || ||  ||

|-  style="background:#;"
| 1979-01-23 || ||align=left| Orachunnoi Hor.Mahachai ||  || Ubon Ratchathani, Thailand || ||  ||

|-  style="background:#cfc;"
| 1978-06-02 || Win||align=left| Sammuen Porntawee || Wilfredo Gomez vs Sagat Porntawee || Nakhon Ratchasima, Thailand || Decision || 5 || 3:00
|-
! style=background:white colspan=9 |

|-  style="background:#cfc;"
| 1977-12-06|| Win||align=left| Attapee Boonrot|| Lumpinee Stadium || Bangkok, Thailand || Decision || 5 || 3:00

|-  style="background:#fbb;"
| 1977-08-30|| Loss||align=left| Panlert Wongmanee || Lumpinee Stadium || Bangkok, Thailand || Decision || 5 || 3:00

|-  style="background:#cfc;"
| 1976-12-03|| Win ||align=left| Jakrawat Kiattisakthewan || Lumpinee Stadium || Bangkok, Thailand || Decision || 5 || 3:00
|-
| colspan=9 | Legend:

References

External links
 

1959 births
Living people
Phat Kongrum
Phat Kongrum
Boxers at the 1988 Summer Olympics
Phat Kongrum
Lightweight boxers
Phat Kongrum
Featherweight kickboxers